Cecil Arthur Kelsick TC (15 July 1920 – 27 September 2017) was a Trinidadian judge who was the Chief Justice of Trinidad and Tobago from 1983 to 1985.

Kelsick was educated at Montserrat Grammar School and King's College London (LLB, 1941; AKC, 1942). He died on 27 September 2017, at the age of 97.

References

1920 births
2017 deaths
Alumni of King's College London
Associates of King's College London
Members of the Inner Temple
Recipients of the Trinity Cross
People from Saint John Parish, Dominica